A total solar eclipse occurred on 19 August 1887. A solar eclipse occurs when the Moon passes between Earth and the Sun, thereby totally or partly obscuring the image of the Sun for a viewer on Earth. A total solar eclipse occurs when the Moon's apparent diameter is larger than the Sun's, blocking all direct sunlight, turning day into darkness. Totality occurs in a narrow path across Earth's surface, with the partial solar eclipse visible over a surrounding region thousands of kilometres wide.
It was visible across Europe, Asia, and Japan.

Observations
The Russian chemist Dmitri Mendeleev ascended in a balloon near Moscow to observe this eclipse. The weather in Tver Governorate was cloudy and it was rain at morning, so Mendeleev forced to fly alone. He made some notes at 6:55, 20 minutes after the start, and made some observations of the solar corona. For this flight, the scientist was awarded the medal of the Academy of Aerostatic Meteorology.

Russian writer Anton Chekhov published the short story "From the Diary of a Hot-Tempered Man" six weeks before the eclipse passed through Russia. The story includes a major section about the frustrations of a man who is trying to make a great variety of observations during the short interval of totality. In the story the eclipse date is given as 7 August 1887, but this is not an error. This is the correct date on the Julian Calendar, then in force in Russia, which did not convert to the Gregorian calendar until after the establishment of the USSR.

Related eclipses

Solar 143

Notes

References
 NASA graphic
 Googlemap
 NASA Besselian elements
 American Eclipse Expedition to Japan: The Total Solar Eclipse of 1887 "Preliminary Report of Prof. David P. Todd, Astronomer in Charge of the Expedition." Published by the Observatory Amherst, Mass., 1888
 
 The total solar eclipse of August 19, 1887 Monthly Notices of the Royal Astronomical Society, Vol. 48, p. 202
 Sketchs of Solar Corona August 19, 1887
 Solar eclipse of August 19, 1887 in Russia 

1887 08 19
1887 in science
1887 08 19
August 1887 events